Bobby Martin may refer to:

Bobby Martin (American football) (1987–2020), American football player
Bobby Martin (musician) (1903–2001), jazz trumpeter
Bobby Martin, bass player for Canadian country group the James Barker Band
Bobby Martin (producer) (1930–2013), American music producer, arranger and songwriter  
Bobby Martin, television series character, see list of All My Children characters

See also
Bobbi Martin (1943–2000), singer
Robert Martin (disambiguation)
Bob Martin (disambiguation)
Bobby Martinez